The Christiaan Huygens Medal, named after the mathematician and natural philosopher Christiaan Huygens, is a prize awarded by the European Geosciences Union to promote excellence in geosciences and space science.

List of prizewinners 

 2021 R. Giles Harrison
 2020 Raffaele Persico
 2019 Lev V. Eppelbaum
 2018 Jothiram Vivekanandan
 2017 Riccardo Lanari
 2016 Karl U. Schreiber
 2015 Kristine M. Larson
 2011 Martin Hürlimann
 2010 Jean-Loup Bertaux
 2009 Valery Korepanov
 2008 Horst Uwe Keller

External links 

 Christiaan Huygens Medal on the European Geosciences Union website

References 

Astronomy prizes
Awards of the European Geosciences Union
Awards established in 2008